Workington railway station is a railway station serving the coastal town of Workington in Cumbria, England. It is owned by Network Rail and managed by Northern Trains.

History 

The first Workington station on the Cumbrian Coast Line was built in the area known as Priestgate Marsh for the Whitehaven Junction Railway. Although the WJR was opened from Maryport to Workington in 1845 the WJR was advertising for tenders for building the station at Workington in October 1846. The WJR station had a single arrival and departure platform (the line was single until 1860) and no platform canopy "the platform is open to the prevailing winds, and " (we) " believe Workington is the only first-class station in Great Britain so unprovided with shelter" complained the Workington town trustees in 1858. In 1854 mis-set points led to a Maryport-Whitehaven goods train being routed into the end bay used by the Workington - Cockermouth trains: the goods train demolished the buffers and "dashed through" the booking office, the porter's office, and the gentleman's waiting room, carrying away the street wall of the station building, and finally coming to rest at the far wall of the ladies' waiting room. The booking office clerk having seen the train approaching, ensured there were no deaths but "the station" reported the Cumberland Pacquet "is of course a perfect wreck"  and had to be re-built. (Immediately after the accident, the gas supply to the station was turned off at the meter, but it was noted that three gas lights continued to burn - the town trustees (who owned the town gasworks) declined to restore the supply until the WJR gave a satisfactory explanation or adequate compensation).

The London & North Western Railway took over the Whitehaven Junction and Workington & Cockermouth lines in 1866, and replaced the WJR station.  The LNWR station was extended further north than the WJR one, with its principal entrance now facing Station Road; a footpath through the goods yard was suppressed, and South Quay (linking the harbour with the town) was carried over the railway on a bridge, replacing a dangerous level crossing.

The station on the coast line retained first claim on Workington, but after the opening of Workington Central could be distinguished from it by local papers as 'the Workington low railway station': it could be formally known as Workington LNWR (to distinguish it from Workington Central, Workington Bridge was also an LNWR station) or (post-grouping, when all three stations were LMS) as Workington Main; with the closure of the other stations it has reverted  (both formally and informally) to being simply 'Workington' railway station. Trains from the Cockermouth and Keswick direction ended with the closure of that branch to all traffic in April 1966, the line having fallen victim to the Beeching Axe.

Layout
The station was built with yellow Crewe bricks and had four tracks running through the station. Two of the tracks which are not served by platforms were once used to stable Travelling Post Office carriages.  There was also a twelve road engine shed, wagon repair shops, a coaling stage, a goods shed and a stable block, all built with local sandstone. In LMS days, a new turntable was installed behind the engine shed. In British Railways days the engine shed was rebuilt with a new roof and ferro-concrete coaling stage and an ash disposal plant was built near to the new turntable. The road approach to the station entrance was remodelled in BR days when the highways near to the station were upgraded.  Immediately adjacent to the southbound platform are two carriage sidings, used for stabling & servicing empty DMU sets overnight and at weekends.  There is also a train crew depot here.

Facilities
The station is staffed throughout the week (closed in the evenings).  There are waiting rooms and covered waiting areas on each platform, which are linked via footbridge.  Step-free access is available to both platforms via ramps and a foot level crossing, though this is only open when station staff are present.  Outside these times, the only available access routes have steps.  A P.A system and digital information screens provide train running information.

Workington North station

As a consequence of the November 2009 Great Britain and Ireland floods, Network Rail built a temporary additional station  from the existing station on waste ground off the A596 adjacent to a business park. An additional hourly shuttle train (composed of a locomotive and at least three former inter-city mainline coaches) operated by Cumbrian-based Direct Rail Services on behalf of Northern Rail, running from Workington northbound to Maryport was  created in the aftermath of the floods. This service started on 30 November 2009 and ran until 28 May 2010. It was initially funded by the Department for Transport at a cost of £216,000. All services between Workington and Maryport were free of charge for this period.

Services
There is generally an hourly service northbound to Carlisle and southbound to Whitehaven with most trains going onward to Barrow-in-Furness (no late evening service operates south of Whitehaven). A few through trains operate to/from Lancaster via the Furness Line.

Train operator Northern introduced a regular through service to Barrow via the coast at the May 2018 timetable change - the first such service south of Whitehaven for more than 40 years.  Services run approximately hourly from mid-morning until early evening, with later trains terminating at Whitehaven.  This represents a major upgrade on the former infrequent service of four per day each way to/from Whitehaven only that previously operated.

References

External links 

 
 

Railway stations in Cumbria
DfT Category E stations
Former London and North Western Railway stations
Railway stations in Great Britain opened in 1846
Northern franchise railway stations
Workington